The men's 1500 metres event at the 1997 European Athletics U23 Championships was held in Turku, Finland, on 10 and 12 July 1997.

Medalists

Results

Final
12 July

Heats
10 July
Qualified: first 4 in each heat and 4 best to the Final

Heat 1

Heat 2

Participation
According to an unofficial count, 19 athletes from 14 countries participated in the event.

 (1)
 (2)
 (2)
 (1)
 (1)
 (1)
 (1)
 (1)
 (2)
 (2)
 (2)
 (1)
 (1)
 (1)

References

1500 metres
1500 metres at the European Athletics U23 Championships